Rahul Tewatia (born 20 May 1993) is an Indian cricketer who plays for Haryana in the domestic cricket and Gujarat Titans in Indian Premier League (IPL). He is an all-rounder who bats left handed and bowls right-arm leg spin. He received his maiden international call up to India's squad for their home T20 series against England in 2021.

Domestic career
Tewatia made his debut for Haryana during the 2013–14 Ranji Trophy on 6 December 2013 against Karnataka at the Bansi Lal Cricket Stadium. He managed 17 runs total in his two appearances at bat. He made his List A debut for Haryana in the 2016–17 Vijay Hazare Trophy on 25 February 2017.

Indian Premier League

Rahul Tewatia made his IPL debut for Rajasthan Royals in 2014. Before the 2014 Indian Premier League, the Rajasthan Royals bought Tewatia. He also made his T20 debut representing Rajasthan Royals in the 2014 IPL. In February 2017, he was bought by the Kings XI Punjab team for the 2017 Indian Premier League. In January 2018, he was bought by the Delhi Daredevils now Delhi Capitals in the 2018 IPL auction. During the 2019 Indian Premier League, he also set the joint record for taking the most catches (4) by a non-wicket keeper in an IPL innings. In November 2019, before the 2020 Indian Premier League, he was traded to the Rajasthan Royals.

On 27 September 2020, he equalled Chris Gayle's record for hitting the most sixes in an over of an IPL match, when he hit 5 sixes off Sheldon Cottrell in the 18th over of the match against Kings XI Punjab. He scored 53 runs in 31 balls, helping his team to chase the target of 224 runs, which became the highest runs ever chased in the Indian Premier League history.

In February 2022, he was bought by the Gujarat Titans in the auction for the 2022 Indian Premier League tournament. On April 8, 2022, during a match against the Punjab Kings, he hit consecutive sixes on the final two balls of the match, leading the Gujarat Titans to their third victory.

International career
In February 2021, he was named in India's Twenty20 International (T20I) squad for their series against England.

References

External links

Indian cricketers
Rajasthan Royals cricketers
Haryana cricketers
North Zone cricketers
1993 births
Living people
People from Faridabad
Cricketers from Haryana
Gujarat Titans cricketers